Maamor or ma'amar (Hebrew, plural: Ma'amarim (masculine); Ma'amaros (feminine)) is derived from the Hebrew word to "speak/pronounce/express/say." It literally means an "expression/statement/enunciation," or in a broader sense "teaching/lesson/discourse." It is sometimes used in traditional Judaism for a printed study of Torah teachings.

Among particular connotations:
Pirkei Avot (Mishnaic "Ethics of the Fathers") states that God created the world with asarah ma'amaros meaning ten of His "expressions," or commands, interpreted in Kabbalah as the 10 Sefirot.
Maamarim (Chabad) is the term used in the Chabad Hasidic dynasty for the central mystical "discourses" in Hasidic thought of each of its 7 leaders.
In the Yeshiva Rabbi Chaim Berlin it refers to a type of public lecture combining a variety of schools of rabbinic thought by Rabbi Yitzchok Hutner.

Hebrew words and phrases
Jewish education